, also known by  and his Chinese style name , was a politician and bureaucrat of Ryukyu Kingdom.

Chōjo was the fourth son of Ie Chōfu. He was also the originator of the aristocrat family Shō-uji Ie Dunchi.

King Shō Kei dispatched Prince Goeku Chōkei (also known as Shō Sei ) and him in 1718 to celebrate Tokugawa Yoshimune succeeded as shōgun of the Tokugawa shogunate. They sailed back in the next year.

He served as a member of sanshikan from 1720 to 1745.

References

1745 deaths
Ueekata
Sanshikan
People of the Ryukyu Kingdom
Ryukyuan people
18th-century Ryukyuan people